Joyride is a 1965 studio album by jazz saxophonist Stanley Turrentine.

Track listing 
"River's Invitation" (Percy Mayfield) – 6:18
"I Wonder Where Our Love Has Gone" (Buddy Johnson) – 4:25
"Little Sheri" (Stanley Turrentine) – 6:29
"Mattie T." (Stanley Turrentine) – 5:59
"Bayou" (Jimmy Smith) – 6:18
"A Taste of Honey" (Ric Marlow, Robert Scott) – 3:57
"Gravy Train" (Lou Donaldson) – 4:38 Bonus track on CD
"A Kettle of Fish" (Jack McDuff) – 4:53 Bonus track on CD

Personnel 
Stanley Turrentine – tenor saxophone 
Herbie Hancock – piano
Kenny Burrell – guitar
Bob Cranshaw – bass
Grady Tate – drums

Orchestra
Clark Terry, Ernie Royal, Snooky Young – trumpet
Henry Coker, J.J. Johnson, Jimmy Cleveland – trombone
Phil Woods – alto saxophone, clarinet
Jerry Dodgion – alto saxophone, flute, alto flute, clarinet, piccolo flute
Danny Bank – baritone saxophone, clarinet, bass clarinet, flute, alto flute
Robert Ashton – tenor saxophone, clarinet
Albert J. Johnson – tenor saxophone, soprano saxophone, clarinet, bass clarinet
Oliver Nelson – arranger, conductor

References

1965 albums
Albums arranged by Oliver Nelson
Albums produced by Alfred Lion
Blue Note Records albums
Stanley Turrentine albums
Albums recorded at Van Gelder Studio
Hard bop albums
Soul jazz albums